Jefferson Township is one of the twelve townships of Williams County, Ohio, United States.  The 2000 census found 2,021 people in the township, 1,969 of whom lived in the unincorporated portions of the township.

Geography
Located in the central part of the county, it borders the following townships:
Madison Township - north
Mill Creek Township - northeast
Brady Township - east
Springfield Township - southeast corner
Pulaski Township - south
Center Township - southwest
Superior Township - west

It is one of only two county townships (the other being Superior Township) without a border on another county.

The villages of Holiday City, the smallest village in Williams County, is located in northwestern Jefferson Township, as is a small part of the village of Montpelier.

Name and history
Jefferson Township was named for Thomas Jefferson, 3rd President of the United States. It is one of twenty-four Jefferson Townships statewide.

Government
The township is governed by a three-member board of trustees, who are elected in November of odd-numbered years to a four-year term beginning on the following January 1. Two are elected in the year after the presidential election and one is elected in the year before it. There is also an elected township fiscal officer, who serves a four-year term beginning on April 1 of the year after the election, which is held in November of the year before the presidential election. Vacancies in the fiscal officership or on the board of trustees are filled by the remaining trustees.

References

External links
County website

Townships in Williams County, Ohio
Townships in Ohio